Milan Sekera (born 14 February 2002) is a Slovak footballer who plays for Spartak Trnava as a right back.

Club career
Sekera made his professional Fortuna Liga debut for Spartak Trnava against MŠK Žilina on 14 June 2020.

References

External links
 FC Spartak Trnava official club profile 
 Futbalnet profile 
 
 

2002 births
Living people
Slovak footballers
Association football midfielders
FC Spartak Trnava players
Slovak Super Liga players